Tyre Jerel Phillips (born January 29, 1997) is an American football offensive guard for the New York Giants of the National Football League (NFL). He played college football at Mississippi State and was drafted by the Baltimore Ravens in the third round of the 2020 NFL Draft.

High school career
Playing at Grenada High School in Grenada, Mississippi, Phillips played football his freshman season before focusing on basketball and marching band. At the behest of a number of people, Phillips returned to the gridiron late in his junior year. He had some scholarship offers from FCS schools, but chose to go to East Mississippi Community College with the eventual goal of being a Division I recruit.

College career
At East Mississippi Community College, Phillips played two seasons with the Lions. He committed to Mississippi State in between his two seasons at EMCC, and enrolled at Mississippi State in January 2017.

Phillips redshirted his first year at Mississippi State, a circumstance he later called "the best thing I ever could have done." He then played at both tackles positions as part of an offensive line rotation during his junior year. During his senior season, Phillips started all 13 games the Bulldogs played in. After the season, Phillips played in the 2020 Senior Bowl.

Professional career

Baltimore Ravens
Phillips was drafted by the Baltimore Ravens in the third round with the 106th overall pick of the 2020 NFL Draft. During training camp, he shifted from tackle to offensive guard and beat out D. J. Fluker for the starting job at the start of the season despite dealing with an ankle injury. He was placed on injured reserve on November 3, 2020, with an ankle injury, and activated on November 30. On December 21, in Week 15 against the Jacksonville Jaguars, Phillips picked up a fumbled ball and ran with it for 22 yards.

On September 13, 2021, Phillips was carted off the field with a knee injury in the first half of the season-opener against the Las Vegas Raiders. It was revealed he suffered a torn ACL and was placed on injured reserve on September 14, 2021. On October 16, 2021, Phillips was activated from injured reserve. On December 30, 2021, Phillips was again placed on injured reserve, putting an end to his sophomore season.

On August 31, 2022, Phillips was released by the Ravens.

New York Giants 
On September 1, 2022, Phillips was signed by the New York Giants.

References

External links
Mississippi State bio
East Mississippi Community College bio

1997 births
Living people
People from Grenada, Mississippi
Players of American football from Mississippi
East Mississippi Lions football players
American football offensive tackles
American football offensive guards
Mississippi State Bulldogs football players
Baltimore Ravens players
New York Giants players